Braden Creek is a stream in the U.S. state of Washington.

Braden Creek was named after L. E. Braden, a pioneer settler.

See also
List of rivers of Washington

References

Rivers of Jefferson County, Washington
Rivers of Washington (state)